Cookham railway station serves the village of Cookham, Berkshire, England. It is  down the line from Maidenhead and  measured from Paddington.

Cookham station was opened by the Wycombe Railway in 1854. The station now has a single platform, but the remains of a second platform are still visible. The former Station House is now let to private occupants.

Services

Trains run hourly in each direction throughout the week (including Sundays), rising to every 30 minutes at weekday peak times.

References

External links

 Historical track layout and signal diagram

Railway stations in Berkshire
DfT Category E stations
Former Great Western Railway stations
Railway stations in Great Britain opened in 1854
Railway stations served by Great Western Railway
1854 establishments in England
Cookham